This is a list of Canadian hedge funds.

List

0–9 

 130/30 Mining LP

A 
 Accountability Capital
 Afina Capital
 AGF Management Limited
 Agilith Capital Inc.
 Albireo Asset Management Corp.
 Algonquin Debt Strategies Fund
AlphaNorth Asset Management
 AlphaNorth Partners Fund
 Altema Diversified Equity Market Neutral Fund
Analytic 130/30 Anson Group
 Arrow Capital Management, Inc.
Arrow Global Advantage Fund
Arrow Performance Fund 
 ATY Trust
 Auspice Diversified Fund
Aventine Canadian Equity Fund
Aarif Inc(Mohammed Aarif Capital)

B 
 Bayxis Capital
 Bayxis Quantum Fund LP
Bellridge Capital 
 Burlington Capital Management Ltd.
 BT Global Growth Fund

C 
 Canadian Convertible Bond Arbitrage Portfolio
CC&L
 CC&L All Strategies Fund
CC&L Multi-Strategy Composite
CC&L Q Global Equity Market Neutral
CI Corporate Class Limited - Signature All Gold Corporate Class
 Clearwater Capital Management Inc.
 Commodities Investment Trust
Crystalline Management
Amethyst Arbitrage Fund
 Curvature Fund LP

D 
D'Anconia Investments Dacha Capital
Delbrook Capital Advisors Inc.
 Deutsche Suisse Asset Management Ltd.
 DKAM Capital Ideas Fund
Donville Kent Asset Management
Dreamplanner Capital

E 
 East Coast Investment Grade II Fund
Edgehill Partners Elmwood Capital Inc.
 Emerald Unhedged Synthetic International Equity Pooled Fund Trust
 Enterprise Capital Management, Inc.
 Epic Capital Management Inc.
 Equilibrium Capital Management Inc.
 Excalibur Capital Management Inc.
 Exemplar Market Neutral Portfolio
EHP Funds
EHP Advantage Fund
EHP Foundation Alternative Fund
EHP Select Alternative Fund
Ewing Morris Opportunities Fund

F 
Fiera Capital Income Opportunities Fund
 Flatiron Capital Management Partners
Formula Growth Ltd.
 Formula Growth Alpha Fund
 Formula Growth Focus Fund
 Formula Growth Global Opportunities Fund
 Formula Growth Hedge Fund 
Friedberg Mercantile Group Ltd.
Friedberg Asset Allocation Fund Ltd.
Friedberg Global-Macro Hedge Fund
 Front Street Capital
 Full Cycle Energy Investment Management Limited

G 
Galliant Equity Long/Short Fund
 Goodwood Inc.
Goodwood Capital Fund
Goodwood Fund
Goodwood Milford Fund
Goodwood SPValue Fund
Gravity Partners Capital Management Inc.
Greenrock Asset Management Ltd.
 GreensKeeper Asset Management Inc
 Guardian Capital
Guardian Strategic Income Fund Composite
various

H 
Hillsdale Investment Management Inc.

I 
IBV Capital Global Value Fund
IMFC Managed Futures Fund
 ING Canadian Market Neutral Fund
 Invesco Canada
Invesco Trimark Corporate Class Inc. - PowerShares Global Gold and Precious Metals Class
 IPM Funds Inc.
 Ivyswood Capital Management Corp. (Dellray Group subsidiary)

J 
Javelin Corporate Development Partners
 JC Clark Ltd.
JC Clark Adaly Trust
JC Clark Canadian Value Fund
JC Clark Focused Opportunities Fund
JC Clark Preservation Trust
Jemekk Capital Management Inc.
Jemekk Long/Short Fund RP Debt Opportunities
Jemekk Total Return Fund RP Select Opportunities
 JM Catalyst Fund

K 
K2 & Associates Investment Management Inc.

L 
Leeward Hedge Funds Inc. 
 Lightwater Partners Ltd.
LionGuard Opportunities Fund LP
Lions Bay Fund
L.P. Lawrence Park Credit Strategies Fund
Lynwood Opportunities Fund

M 
Mackenzie Financial Corporation
 MacNicol & Associates Asset Management Inc.
 Managed Futures Fund
 Marquest Asset Management Inc.
Marquest Canadian Equity Income Fund
 Mavrix Resource Fund 2005 - I LP
 Maxam Diversified Strategies Fund
MGBIS Holdings Ltd.
 Millenium BullionFund
 MineralFields Group
 Mission Trading Corp. (Parker Volatility Futures Fund LP, Parker Balance Equity Fund LP)
 MM Asset Management Inc
 Morgan Bay Capital
Murchinson Ltd
Nomis Bay Ltd

N 
NAVigator Capital Management Inc.
 Novadan Capital Onvest Capital Corp
 Ninepoint Partners
Ninepoint Credit Income Opportunities
Ninepoint Enhanced Long Short Equity Fund

O 
Orchard Asset Management Inc.

P 
Palos Income Fund
Pangaea Asset Management Inc.
 Panorama Fund
Pathway Investment Counsel Inc.
 PCJ Absolute Return Strategy
Peregrine Investment Management, Inc.
Peregrine Fund
Perennial Equity Portfolio
Picton Mahoney Asset Management
 Picton Mahoney Fortified Market Neutral Alternative Fund
Picton Mahoney Global Long Short Equity Fund
Picton Mahoney Global Market Neutral Equity Fund
Picton Mahoney Income Opportunities Fund
Picton Mahoney Long Short Equity Fund
 Polar Asset Management
 Polar Commodity Bond Portfolio
 Polar Long/Short Fund
Polar Multi-Strategy Fund
Polar Securities Inc.
 Polar Volatility Portfolio
 Precession Investments Fund
 Precious Metals Bullion Trust
 Primevestfund
Primex Investments

Q 

 Queen's University Alternative Assets Fund

R 
Red Sky Capital Management
 Redwood Asset Management Inc.
 Renaissance Global Focus Currency Neutral Fund
 Resolute Funds Ltd.
ReSolve Asset Management Inc.
 ReSolve Osprey
 Rogan Investment Management Limited
 Rosalind Advisors, Inc. (life sciences fund manager)
 Rosalind Masters Fund
Rosalind Capital Partners
Rosalind Offshore Fund
 Rosseau Asset Management Ltd.
 Roundtable Capital Partners Inc.
 Russell Sovereign Investment Classes - Russell Managed Yield Class
 RV Investments

S 
S&P GSCI Commodities Fund
 Salida Capital
 Scale Capital SciVest Enhanced Market Neutral Equity Fund
 SciVest North America Long-Short Equity Fund
 Selective Asset Management Inc
 Sentry Select Capital Corp.
 Sentry Select MBS Adjustable Rate Income Fund II
 Sextant Capital Management Inc.
 Sigma Analysis & Management Ltd.
 SMC Man AHL Alpha Fund
 Spartan Fund Management Inc.
BB Fund
ElevenFund
FORT Global Futures (Canada) Trust
Libertas Real Asset Opportunities Fund
LSQ Fund
LSQ SPAC Fund
MM Fund
MMCAP Canadian Fund
StoneCastle Cannabis Growth Fund
Ten Point Fund
Teraz Fund
Sprott Inc.
Sprott Physical Gold Trust
Sprott Physical Gold and Silver Trust
 Sprott Physical Silver Trust
 Sprott Physical Platinum and Palladium Trust
 Stacey Muirhead Capital Management Ltd.
 Star Hedge Managers Corp.
 Stornoway Recovery Fund LP

T 
T. Boone Pickens Energy Fund
 T.I.P. Wealth Manager Inc.
Timelo Strategic Opportunities Fund
 Triumph Asset Management Inc.

U 
University of Toronto Asset Management Corporation

V 
Vantage Protected Performance Fund
Venator Capital Management
Venator Founders Fund
Venator Income Fund
Vertex Fund
Vision Capital Corporation
 Vision Opportunity Fund
Vivid Capital Management

W 
Waratah Capital Advisors
Waratah Income
Waratah One
Waratah Performance
 Waterfront International Ltd
 Watson Corp
 WaveFront Global Asset Management Corp.
 Wealhouse Capital Management
 West Face Capital Inc

Former hedge funds 

 Catalyst Capital Group
 Claymore Investments, Inc.
Claymore Broad Commodity ETF
 Claymore Gold Bullion ETF
 Claymore Inverse Natural Gas Commodity ETF
 Claymore Long-Term Natural Gas Commodity ETF
 Claymore Managed Futures ETF
 Creststreet Capital Corporation
Creststreet 2005 Limited Partnership
Creststreet Kettles Hill Windpower LP
 Quadrexx Asset Management Inc
 Sprott Molybdenum Participation Corporation

References

Hedge_funds